Weroance is an Algonquian word meaning leader or commander among the Powhatan confederacy of the Virginia coast and Chesapeake Bay region. Weroances were under a paramount chief called Powhatan. The Powhatan Confederacy, encountered by the colonists of Jamestown and adjacent area of the Virginia Colony beginning in 1607, spoke an Algonquian language. Each tribe of the Powhatan Confederacy was led by its own weroance. Most foreign writers who have come across a weroance only did so on a special occasion. This is the case because a foreigner's presence was special. John Smith noted that there are few differences between weroances and their subjects.

In older texts, especially from the time of the early Jamestown settlers, spelling was not standardized, so the following spellings are used in different texts:
 weeroance
 weroance
 werowance
 werowans
 wyroance
 wyrounce
 wyrounnces
A weroansqua is a female ruler.  Spellings of this word also vary.

Powers of a weroance
Paramount chiefs let their district and subordinate weroances make the final decision on how to handle a hostile situation. This was made apparent with the events that took place in 1607 and the hostility with the newcomers (English settlers). Weroances and Priest were the only ones allowed to enter into religious temples. A weroance did not go to meet any visitor, visitors were escorted to see a weroance. The weroance, their wives, and councilors often dressed in the finest jewels, and tanned deer skin.

Individual weroances
Several of the weroances' personal names were known and some recorded by William Strachey and other sources. The names of their respective chieftaincies were also commonly used as titles, exactly analogous to European peerages, so that the Weroance of Arrohattec (whose given name was Ashaquid) was often referred to simply as "Arrohattec", much as the Earl of Essex would be referred to just as "Essex" in lieu of a personal name.

When the English arrived in Virginia, some of the weroances subject to the paramount chief Powhatan, or mamanatowick (Wahunsenacawh) were his own nearest male relatives:

 Parahunt, Weroance of the Powhatan (proper), also called Tanx ("little") Powhatan, said by Strachey to be a son of the paramount chief Powhatan, and often confused with same.
 Pochins, Weroance of the Kecoughtan, was also a son of the paramount chief, whom he had appointed there some time after slaying their previous ruler in ca. 1598.  
Opechancanough, Chief Powhatan's younger brother, was a weroance of the Pamunkey, but increased in power, and came to be the effective ruler of the entire Powhatan Confederacy after Wahunsenacawh's death in 1618.

Matrilineal inheritance
In Powhatan society, women could inherit power, because the inheritance of power was matrilineal. In A Map of Virginia John Smith of Jamestown explains:His [Chief Powhatan's] kingdome descendeth not to his sonnes nor children: but first to his brethren, whereof he hath 3 namely Opitchapan, Opechancanough, and Catataugh; and after their decease to his sisters. First to the eldest sister, then to the rest: and after them to the heires male and female of the eldest sister; but never to the heires of the males.

References

Royal titles
Powhatan Confederacy
Titles and offices of Native American leaders